Daniel Embers (born 14 April  1981 in Duisburg) is a German football coach and former footballer.

He made his debut on the professional league level in the Bundesliga for Borussia Mönchengladbach on 16 November 2002, when he started in a game against Bayer 04 Leverkusen.

References

External links
 

1981 births
Living people
German footballers
Borussia Mönchengladbach players
Borussia Mönchengladbach II players
TuS Koblenz players
Wuppertaler SV players
Rot-Weiß Oberhausen players
Bundesliga players
2. Bundesliga players
Association football defenders
VfB Homberg players
Footballers from Duisburg